Landtag elections in the Free State of Bavaria (Freistaat Bayern) during the Weimar Republic were held at irregular intervals between 1919 and 1932. Results with regard to the total vote, the percentage of the vote won, the number of seats allocated to each party and the change in distribution of seats are presented in the tables below. On 31 March 1933, the sitting Landtag was dissolved by the Nazi-controlled central government and reconstituted to reflect the distribution of seats in the national Reichstag. The Landtag subsequently was formally abolished as a result of the "Law on the Reconstruction of the Reich" of 30 January 1934 which replaced the German federal system with a unitary state.

12 January 1919

6 June 1920

6 April 1924

20 May 1928

24 April 1932

References

Elections in Bavaria
Elections in the Weimar Republic
1920s in Bavaria
Bavaria
Bavaria
Bavaria
Bavaria
Bavaria
1930s in Bavaria